The British Animal Honours is a British awards ceremony which honoured the country's most extraordinary animals and the people who dedicate their lives to them. The programme was broadcast by ITV and was presented by Paul O'Grady. Animals are nominated for honours by members of the public, with the winners being decided by a panel of animal experts.

Award ceremonies

2013
The first award ceremony aired on Thursday 18 April 2013 on ITV and was presented by Paul O'Grady.

The ceremony also featured one-off performances from the National Theatre's production of War Horse, a dancing dog troupe led by Kennel Club trainer Gina Pink and a showpiece by the South Wales Police Dog Section. The award ceremony was sponsored by Animal Friends Pet Insurance, who also sponsor O'Grady's other programme For the Love of Dogs.

Expert Panel
The panel of experts consists of: Virginia McKenna, OBE, Celia Hammond, Sean Wensley, Jill Nelson, Simon King, Laura Jenkins, Emily Beament, Emma Milne, Zara Boland, Donal MacIntyre, Jenny Seagrove, Clarissa Baldwin, Peter Gorbing, Tamsin Durston, David Grant, Dr Emily Blackwell, Stuart Winter, Andy Blackmore, Anita Dobson, Johnson Beharry, Maggie Roberts, Caterina Termine, Robbie Marsland, Tim Webb, Marc Abraham, Danny Penman, Daniel Allen, Rosamund Kidman Cox, Anthea Turner and Peter Egan.

References

External links
 Official website

2013 establishments in the United Kingdom
2013 in British television
Animals in the United Kingdom
Award ceremonies in the United Kingdom
Awards established in 2013
ITV (TV network) original programming